Meghali Meenakshi is an Indian actress who has appeared in Tamil cinema . 
She made her Tamil debut in Pa. Vijay's film Aaruthra. The lyricist-cum-actor directed and acted in this venture.

Career 
In April 2017, she signed to play a cameo role in Vikram - Tamannaah starrer Sketch.

Meghali's debut film Aaruthra with Pa. Vijay was released. She is already busy with other projects in Kollywood. The actress is now working on a new Tamil film, titled Ragadam; in which she plays a dual role.

She will be playing the lead along with Jackie Shroff in Tamil movie Paandi Muni, directed by Kasthuri Raja.'The film is set against the backdrop of a jameen family, and revolves around Jackie and Meghali's characters; it's a war between the God and the ghost'.

She played lead role in Nirbhoya, Bengali film directed by Milan Bhowmik and produced by Sanjib Samaddar under the banner of Sambit Media and Productions. This film is based on the 2012 Delhi gang rape case.

Filmography
All films are in Tamil, unless otherwise noted.

References

Indian film actresses
Actresses in Tamil cinema
Living people
Actresses from Kolkata
21st-century Indian actresses
Bengali actresses
Female models from Chennai
Year of birth missing (living people)